Florida Airport  is an airstrip next to the village of Moira in the Santa Cruz Department of Bolivia.

See also

Transport in Bolivia
List of airports in Bolivia

References

External links 
OpenStreetMap - Florida Airport
OurAirports - Florida Airport
FallingRain - Florida Airport

Airports in Santa Cruz Department (Bolivia)